Stanisław Kiecal (September 14, 1886 – October 15, 1910), better known in the boxing world as Stanley Ketchel, was an American professional boxer who became one of the greatest World Middleweight Champions in history. He was nicknamed "The Michigan Assassin." He was murdered at a ranch in Conway, Missouri, at the age of 24.

Biography 

He was born in 1886 in Grand Rapids, Michigan, to Tomasz Kiecal and Julia Kiecal (née Olbinska), whose family immigrated from the village of Sulmierzyce in Piotrków Trybunalski, Guberniya, in modern-day central Poland.

He avoided school, instead falling in with a gang of street kids and often getting into fist fights. At twelve years old, he ran away from home, becoming a child hobo. As a teenager he lived in Butte, Montana, where he found employment first as a hotel bellhop and then as a bouncer. This profession obviously led to many scraps that established his reputation as the best fist fighter in town. Soon enough sixteen-year-old Stanley was performing in backroom boxing matches with older locals for twenty dollars a week. He began traveling throughout Montana, offering to take on any man brave enough to face him. Between 1903 and 1906, he lost just twice in thirty-nine contests and, in 1907, moved to California, where he knew most of boxing's big names and big fights waited for him.

Professional boxing career 
Only a middleweight, Ketchel was also known for taking on heavyweights, who sometimes outweighed him by more than 30 pounds (14 kg). According to hearsay, before each of his fights, he would imagine that his opponent had insulted his mother, with whom he had a very close relationship; thus, his anger would motivate him to fight with fury.

He started boxing professionally in 1903, at 16, in Butte, Montana. In his first fight, Ketchel knocked out Kid Tracy in one round. In his second fight, he was beaten by decision in six rounds by Maurice Thompson. He boxed his first 41 bouts in Montana, and had a record of 36 wins, two losses, and three draws during that span. He lost once more to Thompson in their rematch and then controversially drew with him in their rubber match, in a bout that many people thought Ketchel had won. Afterwards, he went on to beat Tom Kingsley, among others, before moving his campaign on to California in 1907.

There, he won three fights that year, and drew one in Marysville against the man many considered the World Middleweight Champion, Joe Thomas. In his next bout, Thomas and he had a rematch and Ketchel won, by knockout in 32 rounds. Ketchel was then recognized by many as the World Middleweight Champion. He finished the year by beating Thomas again, this time by decision.

Middleweight champion 

On February 8, 1908, Ketchel met the man who was generally recognized as the World Welterweight Champion and one of the leading middleweights of the era, Mike "Twin" Sullivan, knocking him out in the first round and winning general recognition as World Middleweight Champion. Sullivan often fought above the welterweight limit, making him a light middleweight. Whether Ketchel became world champion when he defeated Thomas or Mike Sullivan has always been up to debate, but the fact remains that Mike Sullivan and not Thomas is historically remembered as a world champion.

He proceeded to retain the title against Mike's twin brother, Jack "Twin" Sullivan, also a former world champion, by a knockout in 20 rounds; against future world champion Billy Papke by decision in 10; against Hugo Kelly by a knockout in three and against Thomas, by a knockout in two.

Then, he lost the belt to Papke by a knockout in 12, but Papke and he had an immediate rematch and Ketchel regained the title when he beat Papke by a knockout in 11 in their third match.

Ketchel began 1909 by fighting former Light Heavyweight Champion Philadelphia Jack O'Brien. Ketchel survived a terrible beating at the hand of the slick, quick O'Brien in the early rounds, only to mount a terrific comeback and score four knockdowns in the ninth and tenth rounds. When the final bell rang at the end of the 10th round, O'Brien was lying unconscious on the mat, his head in a resin box in his corner. Under New York rules at the time, though, O'Brien had been saved by the bell and because official decisions were outlawed in New York boxing, the fight was declared a "no decision". A few weeks later, Ketchel had a rematch with O' Brien, knocking out Philadelphia Jack in three rounds.

A fourth fight with Billy Papke followed. Ketchel again won in a tumultuous slugfest to defend his championship and end their series of fights with a record of 3-1 in their four encounters. This (fourth) fight took place in the outdoor Mission Street Arena in Colma, California, during a terrible thunderstorm, yet neither fighter relented in his pursuit of victory until Stanley took the 20-round decision.

Ketchel fought Sam Langford on April 27, 1910. It was a hard-pressed fight by both men, each displaying terrific hitting power for all six rounds of the short bout. No knock downs were scored and both had plenty of energy in the end. Langford won by decision. A longer rematch bout was rumored, but never happened. Some disputed the decision, although a majority of people felt that Langford had won the bout, which following a decision-appealing vote, it was decided (in an uncontroversial manner) that it would stand as a decision win for Langford.

Ketchel vs. Johnson 

Ketchel's 1909 battle with Jack Johnson has been called by many a modern-day "David and Goliath". In the 12th round, Ketchel floored Johnson with a right hand. Johnson got up and knocked out Ketchel with a right uppercut.

Ketchel and Johnson were rumored to have been friends and to have gone gambling, as well as hit the brothels, together; they shared a love for women. Ketchel and Johnson planned to fight together. Because Ketchel was shorter than Johnson, he wore long coats to conceal the platform shoes he had worn to make him look taller at a publicity event. They set up a script for their fight to  stretch it to 20 rounds, as a 20-round fight would guarantee boxing fans would pay to go to local theaters to watch the replay of the fight. After 12 rounds, Ketchel swung a surprise punch that knocked Johnson down. Regaining his feet, Johnson then knocked out Ketchel with a swift combination to Ketchel's head and jaw. Ketchel did not wake up for many minutes and some of his teeth were knocked out by the blow, with a few remaining embedded in Johnson's glove.

Murder 

The following year, 1910, Ketchel fought six times (including one exhibition), but his fast living had worn him down.

Hoping for a rematch with Jack Johnson, Ketchel moved to the ranch of his friend, R. P. Dickerson, near (on what is now referred to as Dickerson Ranch Road) Conway, Missouri, where he had hoped to regain his strength. Dickerson had just hired a cook, Goldie Smith, and a ranch hand, who Smith said was her husband, Walter Kurtz.

Walter Kurtz turned out to be Walter Dipley. Walter Dipley and Goldie Smith were not married, and in fact, had just met each other a month before Dickerson had hired them.

After being upbraided by the "Michigan Assassin" for beating a horse on the morning of October 14, Dipley decided to get even with Ketchel by robbing him. The following morning, Smith seated Ketchel at the breakfast table with his back to the door and Dipley, armed with a .22 caliber rifle, came up behind him and shouted, "Get your hands up!" Ketchel stood up, and as he turned around, Dipley shot him. The bullet traveled from his shoulder into his lung and Ketchel fell to the floor mortally wounded. Dipley then took Ketchel's handgun and smashed Ketchel in the face with it. At the same time, Smith rifled Ketchel's pockets for his money.

After promising to meet Goldie Smith later that night, Dipley ran from the ranch.

As he lay dying, Ketchel told the former ranch foreman, C. E. Bailey, that Goldie Smith had robbed him, she told police officers that Ketchel had raped her and that that was the reason why Dipley had shot him. Her story fell apart and she admitted her complicity in the robbery, but stated she did not know Dipley was going to kill the reigning champion.

In an effort to save the young fighter's life, R. P. Dickerson chartered a special train to take Stanley Ketchel to a hospital in Springfield, Missouri, but Ketchel died around 7 o'clock that night.  His last words were: "I'm so tired. Take me home to mother."

Dickerson also offered a $5,000 dead or alive reward (preferably dead) for Dipley, who was captured at a neighboring farmhouse the next day.

Upon being informed of Ketchel's death, his manager Wilson Mizner reportedly said, "Tell them to start counting ten over him.  He'll get up."

Aftermath 
Both Walter Dipley and Goldie Smith were found guilty of murder and robbery at a jury trial in January 1911, and both were given a life sentence. Goldie Smith had her murder conviction overturned and she served 17 months for the robbery. Walter Dipley served 23 years before he was paroled. He died in 1956, 22 years after his release from prison.

Legacy 

Ketchel was buried at Holy Cross Cemetery at Grand Rapids, Michigan. His funeral was the best-attended burial ceremony in that state until the Ford family surpassed him during the 20th century. A plaque in his honor is at the corner of Stocking Avenue and 3rd Street, and a statue is at 438 Bridge Street Northwest.  The Ketchel Valley neighborhood on Grand Rapids' west side is named in Ketchel's honor.

Ketchel is now enshrined in the International Boxing Hall Of Fame.

The Ring in 2004 ranked Ketchel as the eighth-greatest middleweight of all time, behind Harry Greb, Sugar Ray Robinson, Carlos Monzon, Marvin Hagler, Jake LaMotta, Charley Burley, and Tiger Flowers.  The Ring also named Ketchel number six  on their list of 100 Best Punchers of All Time.

Nat Fleischer, the late ring historian and founding editor of The Ring, considered Stanley to be the greatest middleweight in history.

He had a record of 51 wins, four losses, four draws, one no contest, and four no decisions (newspaper decisions: 2-1-1), with 48 wins by knockout. He was the first middleweight champion to regain the world title after losing it.

Professional boxing record
All information in this section is derived from BoxRec, unless otherwise stated.

Official record

All newspaper decisions are officially regarded as “no decision” bouts and are not counted as a win, loss or draw.

Unofficial record

Record with the inclusion of newspaper decisions to the win/loss/draw column.

Popular culture

Subject of The Killings of Stanley Ketchel, a novel by James Carlos Blake

Subject of the short story "The Light of the World," by Ernest Hemingway, a chapter in Hemingway's 'The Nick Adams Stories']

Biography Stanley Ketchel: A Life of Triumph and Prophecy, by Manuel A. Mora

Biography The Michigan Assassin: The Saga of Stanley Ketchel, by Nat Fleischer, RING Editor 1946

Book Crossing the Color Line: Stanley Ketchel's Challenge for Jack Johnson's Heavyweight Crown, by Vernon Gravely

References

External links 
 
Ketchel's Record at Cyber Boxing Zone
New York Times Article on his death
 Down Great Purple Valleys, a 1954 True magazine story about his murder by John Lardner

|-

|-

1886 births
1910 deaths
Middleweight boxers
Boxers from Michigan
Male murder victims
American people of Polish descent
People murdered in Missouri
Deaths by firearm in Missouri
Sportspeople from Grand Rapids, Michigan
Sportspeople from Butte, Montana
American male boxers